Al Sadd Basketball Team is a Qatari professional basketball team based in Doha, Qatar. Al Sadd Basketball Team is a branch of Sadd Sports Club, which is the most successful team in all of Qatar. The basketball team has won the Qatari Basketball League six times, its last in 2022, and the Emir of Qatar Cup six times.

Honours

Domestic
Qatari Championship

 Winners (6): 1970, 1978, 1979, 1980, 1996, 2013, 2022

Emir of Qatar Cup

 Winners (6): 1980, 1981, 1989, 1991, 1996, 1999

 Qatar Crown Prince Cup

 Winners (1): 2004

Managerial history 
 Bob Carroll (1987)
 Abdulrahman Baker (1990) 
 Mohammed Najjar (1997–1998)
 Samir Nassar (2005–2006)
 John Wojtak (2008–2010)
 Zoran Krečković (2011–2012, 2014–2018)

Notable players 

  Youssef Al-Badr
  Abdulaziz Al Bakri
  Khaled Suliman
  Mohammed Awad
  Zayed Ali Baroud
  Mohammed Yousef
  Johannes Krug
  Yessoufou Bassith
  Hassan Abdullah
  Dieng Bassirou
  Khalifa Diop Babacar
  Milan Vučićević
  Temi Soyebo
  Patrick Simpson
  Michael Sanders
  Curtis Haywood
  Christopher Garnett
  Jason Dixon
  Clint Deas
  Demond Cowins
  Michael Bell
  Michael Southall

See also
Al Sadd Handball Team

References

External links
Official website 
Asia-basket.com - Team Profile 

Basketball teams established in 1969
Basketball teams in Doha